The Clark County Jail is a historic structure located in Neillsville, Wisconsin. It was added to the National Register of Historic Places in 1978. Additionally, it is listed on the Wisconsin State Register of Historic Places and is designated a historic landmark by the Neillsville Historic Preservation Commission.

History
The structure originally served as a jail, as well as a residence for the Sheriff of Clark County, Wisconsin and his family in a separate portion of the building. The county stopped using the building as the sheriff's residence in 1974. In 1978, the county stopped using the jail portion, as well, and the building now serves as a museum.

References

External links

 1897 Clark County Jail Museum

Jails on the National Register of Historic Places in Wisconsin
Jails in Wisconsin
Buildings and structures in Clark County, Wisconsin
Richardsonian Romanesque architecture in Wisconsin
Government buildings completed in 1897
Museums in Clark County, Wisconsin
Prison museums in the United States
History museums in Wisconsin
1897 establishments in Wisconsin
National Register of Historic Places in Clark County, Wisconsin